Usha Pravin Gandhi College of Arts, Science and Commerce, also known as UPG College, is a college in Vile Parle, Mumbai, India that is affiliated with the University of Mumbai. It is a branch of the SVKM Group Shri Vile Parle Kelavani Mandal.

History
The College was established by Shri Vile Parle Kelavani Mandal in 2003. Since its inception in 2003, Usha Pravin Gandhi College has introduced many courses. The college has introduced un-aided courses like Bachelors in Management Studies (BMS), Bachelors in Mass Media (BMM), Bachelors in Information Technology (BSc.IT), Bachelor of Arts (Film, Television and New Media Production) and Masters in Information Technology (MSc.IT).

The college offers add-on courses including:
 Certified digital media marketing.
 Certified digital photography.
 Integrated course in film making.
 Integrated course in television.
 Anupam Kher 's Actor Prepares.

Facilities

The college is situated on the 3rd floor in between Mithibai College and Narsee Monjee College of Commerce and Economics. The college library and staff room are on the 2 and 1/2 floor. The college office is on the 3rd floor. BSc IT and MSc IT lectures are conducted on the 3rd floor. The college has 2 computer labs, 1 electronic lab and 3 classrooms on the 3rd floor. BMM lectures are conducted on the fourth floor, where the college has 6 classrooms. The BMS department conducts its lectures on the 5th floor, in another 6 classrooms available.

Faculties

BMS Department
 Prof Shubhangi Nargund 
 Dr. Mayur Vyas (Co - ordinator )
 Prof Sriram Deshpande
 Prof Abhijeet Mohite
 Prof Lokesh Tardalkar
 Dr. Sharyn Bangera
 Dr. Naresh Sukhani

BMM Department 
 Prof Rashmi Gahwlot (Co-ordinator)
 Dr Navita Kulkarni
 Prof Madhuvanti Date
 Prof Ashish Mehta
 Prof Mayur Sarfare

BSc IT Department 
 Prof Swapnali Lotlikar (Co-ordinator for BSc IT)
 Prof Smruti Nanavaty (Co-ordinator for MSc IT)
 Prof Prashant Chaudhary
 Prof Sunita Gupta

BA FTNMP Department
 Prof Ashish Mehta (Co-ordinator BA)
 Prof Lokesh Tardalkar
Prof Dr. Machunwangliu Kamei
 Prof Sukriti Kohli
 Prof Devanshu Singh

See also
Narsee Monjee College of Commerce and Economics
Dwarkadas J. Sanghvi College of Engineering
Mithibai College

References
 Mingle Box - Review
 Bms.co.in - Review

External links
 

University of Mumbai
Management education